Dipcadi brevifolium is a species of flowering plant in the family Asparagaceae, native to Namibia, the Cape Provinces of South Africa, the Mozambique Channel Islands and Madagascar.

The species was first described, as Hyacinthus brevifolius, by Carl Peter Thunberg in 1794. It was transferred to Dipcadi by Henry Georges Fourcade in 1932.

References

Scilloideae
Flora of the Cape Provinces
Flora of Namibia
Flora of the Mozambique Channel Islands
Flora of Madagascar
Plants described in 1794